Ahmet Refik Özacar  (8 May 1937 – 23 October 2005), known by his given nickname Küçük, literally meaning "Junior", was a Turkish international footballer.

Özacar was a one-club-man, played his entire career at Beşiktaş J.K. between 1955 and 1971.

Achievements
 Süper Lig (3): 1959–60, 1965–66, 1966–67
 Turkish Super Cup (1): 1966–67
 Turkish Federation Cup (2): 1956–57, 1957–58
 Spor Toto Cup (3):  1965–66, 1968–69, 1969–70
 TSYD Cup (2):  1964–65, 1965–66

Individual
Beşiktaş J.K. Squads of Century (Bronze Team)

References

External links
Profile at Turkish Football Federation

1937 births
2005 deaths
Footballers from Istanbul
Turkish footballers
Turkey international footballers
Beşiktaş J.K. footballers
Süper Lig players
Association football midfielders
Association football defenders